The 2009 Rolex Sports Car Series season is the tenth season of the Grand-Am Rolex Sports Car Series presented by Crown Royal Cask No. 16. It is a 12-race schedule beginning at the Rolex 24 at Daytona and ending at Homestead-Miami Speedway. Miami has been moved from early in the schedule to the end, as it will continue in the joint weekend with the IndyCar Series race, which has also been moved to a season closing race. All races will feature both classes. The race at Miller Motorsports Park has been changed from a 1000 kilometers race to a 250-mile race. New Jersey Motorsports Park will be moved from Labor Day weekend to May 3. Infineon Raceway, Hermanos Rodriguez, and Lime Rock have been dropped from the schedule, leaving Montreal as the only race outside the US.

The main Daytona Prototype class was won by the GAINSCO/Bob Stallings Racing pairing of Jon Fogarty and Alex Gurney after a three-way title battle with Chip Ganassi Racing with Felix Sabates duo Scott Pruett and Memo Rojas, and SunTrust Racing's Max Angelelli and Brian Frisselle. Leh Keen and Dirk Werner were comfortable champions in the secondary GT class. Riley Technologies, Ford and Porsche won other titles for highest scoring chassis makers and highest scoring engine manufacturers.

Entry List

Schedule

Season results

Championship Standings

Daytona Prototypes

Driver's

Notes
 Drivers denoted by † did not complete sufficient laps in order to be classified.

Chassis

Engine

Grand Touring

Driver's

Notes
 All drivers denoted by † did not complete sufficient laps to be awarded points.

Engine

References

External links
 The official website of Grand-Am

Rolex Sports Car Series
Rolex Sports Car Series